Ahmad Abbas (Arabic: أحمد عباس; born 8 October 1985) is a Saudi Arabian professional footballer who plays as a midfielder for Al-Qaisumah and the Saudi Arabia national team.

Club career
Abbas began his career with Saudi Professional League club Al-Hilal. He joined Al-Ta'ee in 2006 and spent two years there before moving to Al-Nassr in 2008. Abbas scored two goals in nine league appearances for Al-Nassr during the 2009–10 season.

International career
Abbas made his debut for the Saudi Arabia national team in 2010. He scored his first own goal for his country at the 2010 Gulf Cup of Nations in a 1–0 loss against United Arab Emirates on 2 December 2010.

International goals

References

External links
 

Category:Al-Tai FC players

1985 births
Living people
Saudi Arabian footballers
Saudi Arabia international footballers
Association football midfielders
Al Hilal SFC players
Al Nassr FC players
Najran SC players
Al-Faisaly FC players
Al-Qaisumah FC players
Sportspeople from Jeddah
Saudi Professional League players
Saudi First Division League players